By-elections to the 36th Canadian Parliament were held to fill vacancies in the House of Commons of Canada between the 1997 federal election and the 2000 federal election. The Liberal Party of Canada led a majority government for the entirety of the 36th Canadian Parliament, with increases from by-elections.

Ten seats became vacant during the life of the Parliament. All of these vacancies were filled through by-elections.

See also
List of federal by-elections in Canada

Sources
 Parliament of Canada–Elected in By-Elections 

2000 elections in Canada
1999 elections in Canada
1998 elections in Canada
36th